There are 37 Sites of Special Scientific Interest (SSSIs) in Tyne and Wear, England. In England, the body responsible for designating SSSIs is Natural England, which chooses sites because of their flora, fauna, geological or physiographical features. Natural England took over the role of designating and managing SSSIs from English Nature in October 2006 when it was formed from the amalgamation of English Nature, parts of the Countryside Agency and the Rural Development Service. Natural England, like its predecessor, uses the 1974–1996 county system with each area being called an Area of Search.

Tyne and Wear is made up of five administrative local authorities consisting mainly of the two largest cities in the region: Newcastle-upon-Tyne and Sunderland, thus making it the sixth largest conurbation in the United Kingdom. Tyne and Wear shares its borders with Northumberland and County Durham, to the north and south respectively.

Sites

Notes
 Data rounded to one decimal place.
 Grid reference is based on the British national grid reference system, also known as OSGB36, and is the system used by the Ordnance Survey.
 Those SSSIs with more than one OS grid reference are composed of multiple sections, separated by non-SSSI land.

References

 
Tyne and Wear
Sites of Special Scientific Interest